Clube de Futebol da Amazônia, commonly known as CFA, was a Brazilian football club based in Porto Velho, Rondônia state. They competed in the Série C and in the Copa do Brasil once.

History
The club was founded on January 17, 2001. CFA won the Campeonato Rondoniense in 2002, and the Torneio de Integração da Amazônia in 2003. The club competed in the Copa do Brasil in 2003, when they were eliminated in the Second Round by Bahia, after defeating Rio Branco-AC in the First Round. They competed in the Série C in 2003, when they were eliminated in the First Stage of the competition.

Achievements
 Campeonato Rondoniense:
 Winners (1): 2002
 Torneio de Integração da Amazônia:
 Winners (1): 2003

Stadium

Clube de Futebol da Amazônia played their home games at Estádio Aluízio Ferreira. The stadium has a maximum capacity of 7,000 people.

References

Defunct football clubs in Rondônia
Association football clubs established in 2001
Association football clubs disestablished in 2008
2001 establishments in Brazil
2008 disestablishments in Brazil